The ARM-657 Mamboretá is a rocket of Argentine origin, it carries 6 rockets of 57mm each. It is used in the IA 58 Pucará, Embraer 312 Tucano,  IA 63 Pampa, A-4AR Fightinghawk and Hughes 500 helicopters of the Argentine Air Force, it was also expected to be used by the UH-1H Huey II and the CH-14 Aguilucho of the Argentine Army. It is a design by Fabricaciones Militares and CITEDEF, it is planned to start a production chain in FM and improve the performance of this device.

The rocket that fires is the Aspide, whose heads can be changed for different military purposes. Its main function is to carry out close air support and counterinsurgency missions.

It has two variants: A with intervalometer and B without intervalometer.

References

Rockets and missiles
Argentine inventions